WPDA (106.1 FM) is a radio station broadcasting a classic rock radio format, simulcasting WPDH 101.5 FM Poughkeepsie, New York. Licensed to Jeffersonville, New York, United States, the station is owned by Townsquare Media and features programming from AP Radio.    Its studios are in Poughkeepsie, and its transmitter is located in Liberty, New York.

WPDA also breaks away from the format to simulcast New York Yankees games with sister station, country WKXP.

On August 30, 2013, a deal was announced in which Cumulus Media would swap its stations in Dubuque, Iowa and Poughkeepsie, New York (including WPDA) to Townsquare Media in exchange for Peak Broadcasting's Fresno, California stations. The deal is part of Cumulus' acquisition of Dial Global; Townsquare, Peak, and Dial Global are all controlled by Oaktree Capital Management. The sale to Townsquare was completed on November 14, 2013.

Cultural references
A radio station with call sign WPDA is mentioned in an episode of The Twilight Zone (Season 2, Episode 20, "Static"), although this episode predates the launch of the real-life station.

See also
 WPDH

References

External links

PDA
Classic rock radio stations in the United States
Radio stations established in 1966
Townsquare Media radio stations